The 2015 Uruguay Open is a professional tennis tournament played on clay courts. It is the eleventh edition of the tournament which is part of the 2015 ATP Challenger Tour. It will take place in Montevideo, Uruguay between November 16 and November 22, 2015.

Singles main-draw entrants

Seeds

 1 Rankings are as of November 9, 2015.

Other entrants
The following players received wildcards into the singles main draw:
  Dario Acosta
  Martín Cuevas
  Pablo Cuevas
  Santiago Maresca

The following players received entry from the qualifying draw:
  Andrea Collarini 
  Guillermo Durán 
  Juan Ignacio Galarza
  Orlando Luz

Champions

Singles

 Guido Pella def.  Íñigo Cervantes 7–5, 2–6, 6–4

Doubles

 Andrej Martin /  Hans Podlipnik Castillo def.  Marcelo Demoliner /  Gastão Elias 6–4, 3–6, [10–6]

External links
Official Website

Uruguay Open
Uruguay Open
Open